Kingston City Council is the governing body for the City of Kingston, Ontario, Canada.

The council consists of the Mayor of Kingston and 12 city councillors elected by voters in geographic districts.

Members 2022–2026 
Elected in the 2022 municipal election
 Mayor - Bryan Paterson
 Gary Oosterhof - Countryside District
 Paul Chaves - Loyalist-Cataraqui District
 Lisa Osanic - Collins-Bayridge District
 Wendy Stephen - Lakeside District
 Don Amos - Portsmouth District
 Jimmy Hassan - Trillium District
 Brandon Tozzo - Kingscourt-Rideau District
 Jeff McLaren - Meadowbrook-Strathcona District
 Vincent Cinanni - Williamsville District
 Conny Glenn - Sydenham District
 Gregory Ridge - King's Town District
 Ryan Boehme - Pittsburgh District

Past members

Members 2018–2022 
 Mayor - Bryan Paterson
 Gary Oosterhof - Countryside District
 Simon Chapelle - Loyalist-Cataraqui District
 Lisa Osanic - Collins-Bayridge District
 Wayne Hill - Lakeside District
 Bridget Doherty - Portsmouth District
 Robert Kiley - Trillium District
 Mary Rita Holland - Kingscourt-Rideau District
 Jeff McLaren - Meadowbrook-Strathcona District
 Jim Neill - Williamsville District
 Peter Stroud - Sydenham District
 Rob Hutchison - King's Town District
 Ryan Boehme - Pittsburgh District

Source:

Members 2014–2018 
 Mayor - Bryan Paterson
 Gary Oosterhof - Countryside District (from June 6, 2017)*
 Kevin George - Loyalist-Cataraqui District
 Lisa Osanic - Collins-Bayridge District
 Laura Turner - Lakeside District
 Liz Schell - Portsmouth District
 Adam Candon - Trillium District
 Mary Rita Holland - Kingscourt-Rideau District
 Jeff McLaren - Meadowbrook-Strathcona District
 Jim Neill - Williamsville District
 Peter Stroud - Sydenham District
 Rob Hutchison - King's Town District
 Ryan Boehme - Pittsburgh District

* Richard Allen had been elected to the Countryside District seat but resigned effective December 20, 2016; the seat was to be filled by a by-election on 15 May 2017.

Members 2010–2014 
 Mayor - Mark Gerretsen
 Brian Reitzel - Pittsburgh District
 Sandy Berg - Kingscourt-Strathcona District
 Liz Schell - Portsmouth District
 Bill Glover - Sydenham District
 Dorothy Hector - Lakeside District
 Rob Hutchison - King's Town District
 Jeff Scott - Countryside District
 Kevin George - Loyalist-Cataraqui District
 Rick Downes - Cataraqui District
 Lisa Osanic - Collins-Bayridge District
 Bryan Paterson - Trillium District
 Jim Neill - Williamsville District

Members 2006–2010 
 Mayor - Harvey Rosen
 Leonore Foster - Pittsburgh District
 Steve Garrison - Kingscourt- Strathcona District
 Mark Gerretsen - Portsmouth District
 Bill Glover - Sydenham District
 Dorothy Hector - Lakeside District
 Rob Hutchison - King's Town District
 Joyce MacLeod-Kane - Countryside District
 Rob Matheson - Loyalist-Cataraqui District
 Sara Meers - Cataraqui District
 Lisa Osanic - Collins-Bayridge District
 Vicki Schmolka - Trillium District
 Ed Smith - Williamsville District

City Council 2003–2006 
 Mayor - Harvey Rosen
 George Stoparczyk - Trillium
 George Sutherland - Countryside
 Kevin George - Loyalist-Cataraqui
 George Beavis - Lakeside
 Sara Meers - Cataraqui
 Steve Garrison - Kingscourt Strathcona
 Beth Pater - Portsmouth
 Ed Smith - Williamsville
 Floyd Patterson - Sydenham
 Rick Downes - King's Town
 Leonore Foster - Pittsburgh
 Bittu George - Collins-Bayridge

References
 Kingston City Council

Notes

See also
 Votes of Kingston City Councillors by Councillor and by issue at the Kingston Taxpayer's Association website.

Municipal councils in Ontario
Kingston, Ontario